Andrey Ivanovich Melensky (1766–1833) was a Russian Imperial Neoclassical architect from Moscow who was appointed the city architect of Kiev (now Kyiv, Ukraine) in 1799 and held the post for some thirty years.

Melensky began his career as an assistant to Matvey Kazakov, Vasily Bazhenov, and Giacomo Quarenghi and was involved in the construction of the Catherine Palace on the Yauza River. He was put in charge of the reconstruction of Podil after the great 1811 fire and succeeded in remodeling the district in a provincial Palladian style. Melensky was the first architect to be given the position of City Architect of Kiev.

Major commissions 

 Contracts House
 Magdeburg Rights Column
 Church of St. Nicholas, Podil
 Nativity Church, Podil
 Holy Cross Church, Podil
 Askold Grave Church
 Resurrection Church at the Florivsky Convent
 Reconstruction of the Podil Gostiny Dvor
 Old building of the city theatre
 Old House of Nobility

References 

Architects from Kyiv
Russian neoclassical architects
History of Kyiv
Architects from Moscow
1766 births
1833 deaths